Musical comb may refer to

A comb-like lamellaphone
Comb and paper
A comb-like element of various disc-playing music boxes, such as Polyphon